Historia de Una Reina (English History of a queen) is a compilation album by the Mexican pop singer, Ana Gabriel. It was released in 2005. It was nominated to Latin Greatest Hits Album Of The Year in the Latin Billboard Music Awards of 2006, but lost to Marco Antonio Solís La Historia Continúa... Parte II.

Track listing
Tracks:
 Quién Como Tú 03:35
 Simplemente Amigos 03:49
 Es el Amor Quien Llega 03:50
 Es Demasiado Tarde 04:14
 Pecado Original 03:29
 Evidencias 04:15
 Ahora 03:24
 Cosas del Amor 04:20
 En la Oscuridad 03:59
 Un Viejo Amor 03:19
 Ay Amor 03:25
 Con un Mismo Corazón 03:38
 Luna 04:33
 La Reina 03:36
 Huelo a Soledad 04:21
 Mi Gusto Es 02:53

Album charts

 Note: This release reached the #3 position in Billboard Latin Pop Albums staying for 70 weeks  and it reached the #5 position in the Billboard Top Latin Albums staying for 33 weeks in the chart. This was also her first entry ever to the Billboard 200.

References

Ana Gabriel compilation albums
2005 greatest hits albums